Miao Pu (born 22 February 1977) is a Chinese actress.

Biography
Miao was born in a family of actors in Xi'an. Her parents are both Qinqiang actors. When she was five years old, she firstly performed on the stage with her parents in the play, "The New Year Sacrifice"(祝福). She played the role of Máo, the son of Xianglin Sao. In 1995, she won the first in the second International Visual and Performing Arts Competition. In 1998, she graduated from Beijing Film Academy(BFA). Only one-year graduation from BFA, she had cooperated with several famous directors like Yimou Zhang and Jianxin Huang. She, Li Xiaolu, Tao Hong and  Zhu Yuanyuan were together called Four Tsing Yi at that time.

Miao participated in the period drama series “Legacy” which will premiere exclusively on WarnerMedia's regional streaming service HBO Go at an unspecified date later in 2021. “Legacy” is a 1920s-set drama that chronicles the lives of the wealthy Yi family and three sisters who vie to inherit their father's shopping mall business. In a time of upheaval and uncertainty, the three sisters set aside their differences to keep the business afloat and save their family.

Filmography

Film

Television

Awards
 2005  the nomination of the 25th Flying Apsaras Award
 2006  the nomination of Golden Eagle Award
 2007/10/20  the nomination of best actress in Tokyo International Film Festival
 2007  Forbes the Most Potential Figure Award
 2008  the best actress in the 15th Beijing College Student Film Festival
 2008  the best actress of the 17th Shanghai Film Critics Awards
 2009/8/5  China Film Society of Performing Art Award

References

External links
 

1977 births
Living people
Actresses from Shaanxi
Actresses from Xi'an
Chinese television actresses
Chinese film actresses